Juan Gabriel Guzmán (born 17 June 1987 in Costa Rica) is a Costa Rican footballer.

References

Costa Rican footballers
Living people
1987 births
Association football midfielders
C.S. Cartaginés players
Deportivo Saprissa players